The House at 1 Morrison Avenue is one of a few Tudor Revival houses in Wakefield, Massachusetts.  The -story wood-frame house has a hip roof with a copper crest, central dormer, and a larger projecting gable section on the left.  The single story porch wraps around two sides of the house, and features a high gable over the front stairs which is decorated with bargeboard and half timbers.  It was built c. 1890 on land that had been acquired and subdivided by J.S. Merrill and Charles Hanks as part of the major Wakefield Park subdivision.

The house was listed on the National Register of Historic Places in 1989.

See also
National Register of Historic Places listings in Wakefield, Massachusetts
National Register of Historic Places listings in Middlesex County, Massachusetts

References

Houses on the National Register of Historic Places in Wakefield, Massachusetts
Houses completed in 1890
Houses in Wakefield, Massachusetts
Tudor Revival architecture in Massachusetts